In many countries, women have been underrepresented in the government and different institutions. This historical tendency still persists, although women are increasingly being elected to be heads of state and government.

As of October 2019, the global participation rate of women in national-level parliaments is 24.5%.  In 2013, women accounted for 8% of all national leaders and 2% of all presidential posts. Furthermore, 75% of all female prime ministers and presidents have taken office in the past two decades. 

Women may face a number of challenges that affect their ability to participate in political life and become political leaders. Several countries are exploring measures that may increase women's participation in government at all levels, from the local to the national and international. However, more women are pursuing leadership positions in the present day.

Worldwide status of women's representation in government

Presidents and prime ministers
The number of women leaders around the world has grown, but they still represent a small group. At the executive levels of government, women become prime ministers more often than they become presidents. Part of the differences in these roads to power is that prime ministers are elected by political party members themselves while presidents are elected by the public. In 2013, women accounted for 8 percent of all national leaders and 2 percent of all presidential posts. Furthermore, 75 percent of all female prime ministers and presidents have taken office in the past two decades. Since 1960 to 2015, 108 women have become national leaders in 70 countries, with more being prime ministers than presidents.

Individual female executives usually have high levels of education and may have close relationships with politically prominent or upper-class families. The general status of women in a country does not predict if a woman will reach an executive position since, paradoxically, female executives have routinely ascended to power in countries where women's social standing lags behind men's.

Women have long struggled in more developed countries to become president or prime minister. Israel elected its first female prime minister in 1969 but has never done so again. The United States, on the other hand, has had no female presidents.

Sri Lanka was the first nation to possess a female president, Chandrika Kumaratunga (1994–2000), and a female prime minister (Sirimavo Bandaranaike) simultaneously. This also marked the first time that a female prime minister (Sirimavo Bandaranaike) directly succeeded another female prime minister (Chandrika Kumaratunga). Mary McAleese's election as president of Ireland (1997–2011) was the first time that a female president directly succeeded another female president, Mary Robinson. Jóhanna Sigurðardóttir, prime minister of Iceland (2009–2013), was the world's first openly lesbian world leader, first female world leader to wed a same-sex partner while in office.

The longest serving female non-royal head of government and longest serving female leader of a country is Sheikh Hasina.

In 2021 Estonia became the first country to have both a female elected head of state and elected head of government.
(If you only consider countries where the head of state is directly elected, then the first country to have both an elected female head of state and an elected female head of government is Moldova, also in 2021).

National parliaments

The proportion of women in national parliaments around the world is growing, but they are still underrepresented. As of April 1, 2019, the global average of women in national assemblies is 24.3 percent. At the same time, large differences exist between countries, e.g. Sri Lanka has quite low female participation rates in parliament compared with Rwanda, Cuba, and Bolivia, where female representation rates are the highest. Three of the top ten countries in 2019 were in Latin America (Bolivia, Cuba, and Mexico), and the Americans have seen the greatest aggregate change over the past 20 years.

Out of 192 countries listed in descending order by the percentage of women in the lower or single house, the top 20 countries with the greatest representation of women in national parliaments are (figures reflect information as of January 1, 2020; a – represents a unicameral legislature with no upper house):

New figures are available for up to February 2014 from International IDEA, Stockholm University and Inter-Parliamentary Union.

Although 86% of countries have reached at least 10% women in their national legislature, far fewer have crossed the 20% and 30% barriers. As of July 2019, only 23% of sovereign nations had more than 30% women in parliament. The major English-speaking democracies are placed mostly in the top 40% of the ranked countries. New Zealand ranks at number 5 with women comprising 48.3% of its parliament. The United Kingdom (32.0% in the lower house, 26.4% in the upper house) ranks at number 39, while Australia (30.5% in the lower house, 48.7% in the upper house) ranks at number 47 out of 189 countries. Canada is ranked at 60 (29.6% lower house, 46.7% upper house), while the United States ranks 78 (23.6% in the lower house, 25.0% in the upper house). Not all of these lower and/or upper houses in national parliaments are directly elected; for example, in Canada, members of the upper house (the Senate) are appointed.

, Cuba has the highest percentage for countries without a quota. In South Asia, Nepal is highest in the rank of women participation in politics with (33%). Among East Asian countries, Taiwan has the highest percentage of women in Parliament (38.0%).

Pamela Paxton describes three factors that are reasons why national-level representation has become much larger over the past several decades. The first is the changing structural and economic conditions of nations, which says that educational advancements along with an increase in women's participation in the labor force encourages representation. The second is the political factor; representation of women in office being based on a proportionality system. Some voting systems are built so that a party that gains 25% of the votes gains 25% of the seats. In these processes, a political party feels obligated to balance the representation within their votes between genders, increasing women's activity in political standing. A plurality-majority system, such as used in the United States, United Kingdom, and India, has only allows single candidate elections, and thus allows political parties to entirely dictate regions' representatives even if they only control a small majority of the vote. Last, there is the ideological disposition of a country; the concept that the cultural aspects of women's roles or positions in the places they live dictate where they stand in that society, ultimately either helping or handicapping those women from entering political positions.

In 1995, the United Nations set a goal of 30% female representation. The current annual growth rate of women in national parliaments is about 0.5% worldwide. At this rate, gender parity in national legislatures will not be achieved until 2068.

Diplomacy
In Brazil, the Secretariat of Policies for Women, was until recently the main Brazilian state-feminism agency at the federal level. Under Workers' Party governments (2003-2016), Brazil carried out women-focused policies in three dimensions of its foreign policy: diplomacy, development cooperation, and security.

In Ireland, Ann Marie O'Brien has studied the women in the Irish Department of External Affairs associated with the League of Nations and United Nations, 1923–1976. She finds that women had greater opportunities at the UN.

In the United States, Frances E. Willis joined the Foreign Service in 1927, becoming only the third American woman to do so. She served in Chile, Sweden, Belgium, Spain, Britain, and Finland as well as the State Department. In 1953, she became the first female US ambassador to Switzerland and later served as ambassador to Norway and Ceylon. Willis's rise in the Foreign Service was due to her competence, hard work, and self-confidence. Also helpful in her career was the support of influential mentors. While not a militant feminist, Willis blazed a trail for other female diplomats to follow.

Local representation
A 2003 survey conducted by United Cities and Local Governments (UCLG), a global network supporting inclusive local governments, found that the average proportion of women in local council was 15%.  In leadership positions, the proportion of women was lower: for instance, 5% of mayors of Latin American municipalities are women.

There has been an increasing focus on women's representation at a local level.  Most of this research is focused on developing countries. Governmental decentralization often results in local government structures that are more open to the participation of women, both as elected local councilors and as the clients of local government services.

According to a comparative study of women in local governments in East Asia and the Pacific, women have been more successful in reaching decision-making position in local governments than at the national level.  Local governments tend to be more accessible and have more available positions.  Also, women's role in local governments may be more accepted because they are seen as an extension of their involvement in the community.

Challenges faced by women
Political scientists separate the causes behind the underrepresentation of women in governmental positions into two categories: supply and demand. Supply refers to women's general ambition to run for office and access to resources like education and time, while demand refers to elite support, voter bias and institutional sexism. Women face numerous obstacles in achieving representation in governance. The biggest challenges a woman in government can face occur during the pursuit of her position in government office, as opposed to when she is upholding said position. Studies show that one of the big challenges is financing a campaign. Studies also show that women running for political office raise a similar amount of money in comparison to their male counterparts, however they feel they need to work harder to do so.

According to a survey conducted on a sample of 3,640 elected municipal officeholders, women face adversities with things such as financing a campaign because they are not as heavily recruited as men by party leaders. There are two factors that contribute to this trend. Firstly, party leaders tend to recruit candidates who are similar to them. Since most party leaders are men, they usually see men as prime candidates because they share more similarities than most woman do. The same concept applies when discussing the second factor. Recruitment works through networks such as lower level office holders or affiliated businesses. Since women are underrepresented in these networks, according to statistics, they are less likely to be recruited than men. Due to these challenges, women have to spend time and conscious effort building a financial support system, unlike men.

Some have argued that politics is a "matrix of domination" designed by race, class, gender and sexuality. Intersectionality plays a large role in treatment women face when running for political office and their time serving in a political position. One study in Brazil found racial disparities that fall even heavier on women candidates during candidate recruitment and selection processes. Afro-descendant Brazilian women were the most disadvantaged when running for political office.

Society 
Gender inequality within families, inequitable division of labor within households, and cultural attitudes about gender roles further subjugate women and serve to limit their representation in public life. Also, the political underrepresentation of women in post-Soviet democracy that tend to be characterized by high levels of political corruption is often expect to be a results of patriarchal gender norms and voter's preferences for placing men in leadership positions(Moser and Scheiner, 2012).   Societies that are highly patriarchal often have local power structures that make it difficult for women to combat.  Thus, their interests are often not represented or under-represented.

Voter bias 
One major challenge female candidates must overcome to obtain political positions is voter bias. According to one study, women were more likely to state that it was easier for men to get elected into higher office. The study found that 58% of men and 73% of women claimed it was easier for men to get elected into higher office. In the US, according to one survey, 15% of Americans still believe men make better political candidates than women. Another survey found that 13% of American women either strongly agree or agree that men tend to make better political candidates than women do.

In the US, many voters assume men and women possess traits that reflect the stereotypes they believe. Many assume women candidates are too emotional, more willing to give-in or compromise, under-qualified, and more gentle. These notions often affect women negatively, as people often believe that many women should not be running for office because of these candidate stereotypes.

Systematic challenges 
There have been many arguments saying the plurality-majority voting system is a disadvantage to the chance that women get into office. Andrew Reynolds brings forth one of these arguments by stating: "Plurality-majority single-member-district systems, whether of the Anglo-American first-past-the-post (FPTP) variety, the Australian preference ballot alternative vote (AV), or the French two-round system (TRS), are deemed to be particularly unfavorable to women's chances of being elected to office". Andrew believes that the best systems are list-proportional systems. "In these systems of high proportionality between seats won and votes cast, small parties are able to gain representation and parties have an incentive to broaden their overall electoral appeal by making their candidate lists as diverse as possible".

Even once elected, women tend to hold lesser valued cabinet ministries or similar positions. These are sometimes described as "soft industries" and include health, education, and welfare.  Far less often do women hold executive decision-making authority in more powerful domains or those that are associated with traditional notions of masculinity (such as finance and the military).  Typically, the more powerful the institution, the less likely it is that women's interests will be represented.  Additionally, in more autocratic nations, women are less likely to have their interests represented. Many women attain political standing due to kinship ties, as they have male family members who are involved in politics. These women tend to be from higher income, higher status families and thus may not be as focused on the issues faced by lower income families. In The United States, the lower end of the professional ladder contains a higher proportion of women while the upper level contains a higher proportion of men. Research shows that women are underrepresented in head positions in state agencies making up only 18% of Congress and 15% of corporate board positions. When women do gain any level of representation it is in the fields of health, welfare, and labor. They are seen to be addressing issues labeled as feminine.

Personal life and choices 
Additionally, women running for public office typically gain additional, unnecessary scrutiny on their private lives.  For instance, fashion choices of politically active women are often picked apart by the media. In these "analyses" women rarely gain approval from those in the media, who usually say they either they show too much skin or too little, or perhaps that they either look too feminine or too masculine. Sylvia Bashevkin also notes that their romantic lives are often subject of much interest to the general population, perhaps more so than their political agenda or stances on issues. She points out that those who "appear to be sexually active outside a monogamous heterosexual marriage run into particular difficulties, since they tend to be portrayed as vexatious vixens" who are more interested in their private romantic lives than in their public responsibilities.  If they are in a monogamous, married relationship but have children, then their fitness for office becomes a question of how they manage being a politician while taking care of their children, something that a male politician would rarely, if ever, be asked about.

Family duties and family forming cause significant delays in aspiring women's political careers.

A 2017 study found that female Republican candidates fare worse in elections than Republican men and Democratic women.

A 2020 study found that being promoted to the position of mayor or parliamentarian doubles the probability of divorce for women, but not for men.

Political parties
In Canada, there is evidence that female politicians face gender stigma from male members of the political parties to which they belong which can undermine the ability of women to reach or maintain leadership roles. Pauline Marois, leader of the Parti Québécois (PQ) and the official opposition of the National Assembly of Quebec, was the subject of a claim by Claude Pinard, a PQ "backbencher", that many Quebecers do not support a female politician: "I believe that one of her serious handicaps is the fact she's a woman [...] I sincerely believe that a good segment of the population won't support her because she's a woman". A 2000 study that analyzed 1993 election results in Canada found that among "similarly situated women and men candidates", women actually had a small vote advantage. The study showed that neither voter turnout nor urban/rural constituencies were factors that help or hurt a female candidate, but "office-holding experience in non-political organizations made a modest contribution to women's electoral advantage".

Bruce M. Hicks, an electoral studies researcher at Université de Montréal, states that evidence shows that female candidates begin with a head start in voters' eyes of as much as 10 per cent, and that female candidates are often more favorably associated by voters with issues like health care and education. The electorate's perception that female candidates have more proficiency with traditional women's spheres such as education and health care presents a possibility that gender stereotypes can work in a female candidate's favor, at least among the electorate. In politics, however, Hicks points out that sexism is nothing new:

Within Quebec itself, Don McPherson pointed out that Pinard himself has enjoyed greater electoral success with Pauline Marois as party leader than under a previous male party leader, when Pinard failed to be elected in his riding. Demographically, Pinard's electoral riding is rural, with "relatively older, less-well educated voters".

In Nigeria, there are not many women in positions of leadership. Only seven of the 109 senators and 22 of the 360 members of the House of Representatives are women at the moment.There are several explanations for why women's political party participation is so low. For instance, women are discouraged from running for office due to the expensive expense of politics. The requisite nomination and declaration of interest forms that political parties require candidates to submit in order to run for seats on their platform frequently out of the reach of women. Also, the price of an election campaign is outrageous. And limited access to education also means limited access to jobs that pay well. Women are also less likely to be able to afford to continue the process of obtaining leadership positions due to unpaid labor responsibilities, unequal inheritance rights, and open discrimination.

Moreover, societal barriers to women's representation exist.

Resource gaps 
In one study that looked at campaign funding in Chile, researchers found a significant gender bias against women in campaign funding. In Chile, parties are given money directly from the government to allocate to their various candidates, and candidates are limited to a certain amount of money they can spend on their campaign. The Chilean government instituted multiple policies to try and increase gender representation. They placed a 40% quota on political seats and reimbursed political parties when they chose female political candidates in an effort to incentivize them. Even in this "least-likely" case, researchers found that in candidates with no prior experience running for office, men would out fundraise women.

Intersectionality and challenges faced by women 
Many of the challenged women face that leads to their underrepresentation in political office is amplified through other institutional factors. Race, specifically, plays an increasingly large role in the challenges faced by women when deciding to run for office, actively running for office, and actively holding office. In one study which focused on the treatment of Afro-Brazilian women, researchers found that institutionalizing parties increases the chance that parties will elect women, however the effect is more muted for Afro-Brazilians. In Brazil, African-Americans already face a significant resource gap like lower average income, lower levels or legislation and higher illiteracy rates. In conjunction with these barriers, Afro-Brazilian women also face barriers to access to power. Researchers found that Afro-descendant women consistently raised less money and won fewer voters even when they possesses traditional characteristics of an adequate political candidate.

One study found that intersectionality plays a significant role in the ambition of women and their decision to run for political office. They found that when women were told the different reasons for underrepresentation of women in political office, women of different races responded very differently. Researchers stated that "Attributing women’s lack of parity to demand factors allows white and Asian women to “discount” the possibility that failure rests on their own abilities, thus increasing women's political ambition. Alternatively, framing women's underrepresentation as due to supply factors depresses white and Asian women's political ambition possibly because of stereotype threat. Black women respond in an opposite manner, with depressed political ambition in demand scenarios, while Latinas are unaffected by these narratives."

Mirror representation

Women's participation in formal politics is lower than men's throughout the world.  The argument put forth by scholars Jacquetta Newman and Linda White is that women's participation in the realm of high politics is crucial if the goal is to affect the quality of public policy. As such, the concept of mirror representation aims to achieve gender parity in public office. In other words, mirror representation says that the proportion of women in leadership should match the proportion of women in the population that they govern. Mirror representation is premised on the assumption that elected officials of a particular gender would likely support policies that seek to benefit constituents of the same gender.

Effects on public policy 
A key critique is that mirror representation assumes that all members of a particular sex operate under the rubric of a shared identity, without taking into consideration other factors such as age, education, culture, or socioeconomic status. However, proponents of mirror representation argue that women have a different relationship with government institutions and public policy than that of men, and therefore merit equal representation on this facet alone. This feature is based on the historical reality that women, regardless of background, have largely been excluded from influential legislative and leadership positions. As Sylvia Bashevkin notes, "representative democracy seems impaired, partial, and unjust when women, as a majority of citizens, fail to see themselves reflected in the leadership of their polity." In fact, the issue of participation of women in politics is of such importance that the United Nations has identified gender equality in representation (i.e. mirror representation) as a goal in the Convention on the Elimination of All Forms of Discrimination against Women (CEDAW) and the Beijing Platform for Action. Besides seeking equality, the goal of mirror representation is also to recognize the significance of women's involvement in politics, which subsequently legitimizes said involvement.

There have been differing results between studies that looked at the significance of women's representation on actual policy outcomes. Though women in the United States are more likely to identify as feminists, a 2014 study looking at the United States finds "no effect of gender of the mayor on policy outcomes." A 2012 study finds mixed evidence that the share of female councilors in Sweden affected conditions for women citizens, such as women's income, unemployment, health, and parental leave. A 2015 study in Sweden said that: "The findings show that female legislators defend feminist interests more than their male colleagues but that they only marginally respond to women's electoral preferences." A 2016 study looking at African politicians finds "gender differences in policy priorities [to be] quite small on average, vary across policy domains and countries". According to the OECD, the increased presence of women cabinet ministers is associated  with a rise in public health spending across many countries.

Social and cultural barriers
Mirror representation stems from the barriers female political candidates often face. These include sex stereotyping, political socialization, lack of preparation for political activity, and balancing work and family. In the media, women are often asked how they would balance the responsibilities of elected office with those to their families, something men are never asked.

Sex stereotyping: Sex stereotyping assumes that masculine and feminine traits are intertwined with leadership. Hence, the bias leveled against women stems from the perception that femininity inherently produces weak leadership. Due to the aggressive and competitive nature of politics, many insist that participation in elected office requires masculine traits.  Sex stereotyping is far from being a historical narrative. The pressure is on female candidates (and not male ones) to enhance their masculine traits in order to garner support from voters who identify with socially constructed gender roles. Apart from this, studies by American University in 2011 reveal that women are 60% less likely than men to believe that they are not qualified to take politics responsibility. So, the patriarchy in politics is responsible for less participation of women.

Sexual and physical violence: In Kenya, a woman's rights activist named Asha Ali was threatened and beaten by three men for standing as a candidate in front of her kids and elderly mother. A 2010 survey of eight hundred likely U.S voters found that even very mild sexist language had an impact on their likelihood of voting for a woman (Krook, 2017). Even in early 2016, a 14-year-old girl was kidnapped from her bed late at night and raped as revenge for her mother's victory in local elections in India, which is an example of sexual violence. All of this evidence suggests that women face many challenges in a political environment where men try to suppress women whenever they try to raise their voices in politics for making positive change for women's empowerment.

Lack of media support: The qualitative and quantitative study reveals that media reflects and strengthens a male-overwhelmed society. Women in the news is usually for bad news and just for all the vulgar or wrong reasons such as about their looks, personal life and their clothes and characters. Media likes to give more updates about all these above examples instead of their actual politics role and achievements

Political socialization: Political socialization is the idea that, during childhood, people are indoctrinated into socially constructed norms of politics. In the case of women's representation in government, it says that sex stereotyping begins at an early age and affects the public's disposition on which genders are fit for public office. Socialization agents can include family, school, higher education, mass media, and religion. Each of these agents plays a pivotal role in either fostering a desire to enter politics, or dissuading one to do so.

Generally, girls tend to see politics as a "male domain". Newman and White suggest that women who run for political office have been "socialized toward an interest in and life in politics" and that "many female politicians report being born into political families with weak gender-role norms."

Women running for U.S senate are often underrepresented in news coverage. The way male and female candidates are depicted in media has an effect on how female candidates gets elected in to public office. Female candidates get treated differently in the media than their male counterparts in the U.S senate elections. Women receive less news coverage and the coverage they do receive concentrates more on their viability and less on their issue positions, which causes female candidates to be overlooked and underrated during elections, which is an obstacle for women running for U.S senate.

Lack of preparation for political activity: An aftereffect of political socialization is that it determines how inclined women are to pursue careers that may be compatible with formal politics. Careers in law, business, education, and government, professions in which women happen to be minorities, are common occupations for those that later decide to enter public office.

Balancing work and family: The work life balance is invariably more difficult for women, because they are generally expected by society to act as the primary caregivers for children and maintainers of the home. Due to these demands, it is assumed that women would choose to delay political aspirations until their children are older. Also, a woman's desire for a career in politics along with the extent that the respondent feels her family duties might inhibit her ability to be an elected official. Research has shown that new female politicians in Canada and the U.S. are older than their male counterparts. Conversely, a woman may be pushed to remain childless in order to seek political office.

Institutional barriers may also pose as a hindrance for balancing a political career and family. For instance, in Canada, Members of Parliament do not contribute to Employment Insurance; therefore, they are not entitled to paternity benefits.   Such lack of parental leave would undoubtedly be a reason for women to delay seeking electoral office. Furthermore, mobility plays a crucial role in the work-family dynamic. Elected officials are usually required to commute long distances to and from their respective capital cities, which can be a deterrent for women seeking political office.

Pathways to political involvement 
Globally, there have been four general pathways that have led women into political office:

 Political family – women in this path come from families that have a long history of involvement in electoral politics.
 Surrogate – women in this path have assumed office, often temporarily, as a surrogate for a father, husband, or brother who has recently died.
 Party or political insider – women in this path start at the bottom of a party or political ladder and work their way up over time filling in necessary roles to show loyalty to the party.
 Political outsider – women in this path usually lack political experience but they run on a platform emphasizing new political changes and serve as an alternative to the status quo.

Political recruitment model 
The political recruitment model is a term coined by political scientists who studied why women do not hold political positions at the same rates men do. The political recruitment model categorizes the steps between a citizen and politician, and many political scientists use this to study where women are losing the opportunity and chances to hold elected office. The political recruitment model has four parts; eligible, aspirants, candidates, and elected. When studying pathways to political involvement, political scientists focus on where in this pipeline women tend to "leak out of".

Policies to increase women's participation

The United Nations has identified six avenues by which female participation in politics and government may be strengthened. These avenues are: equalization of educational opportunities, quotas for female participation in governing bodies, legislative reform to increase focus on issues concerning women and children, financing gender-responsive budgets to equally take into account the needs of men and women, increasing the presence of sex-disaggregated statistics in national research/data, and furthering the presence and agency of grassroots women's empowerment movements.

The first government organization formed with the goal of women's equality was the Zhenotdel, in Soviet Russia in the 1920s.

Education
Women with formal education (at any level) are more likely to delay marriage and subsequent childbirth, be better informed about infant and child nutrition, and ensure childhood immunization. Children of mothers with formal education are better nourished and have higher survival rates. Education is a vital tool for any person in society to better themselves in their career path, and equalization of educational opportunities for boys and girls may take the form of several initiatives:

 abolishment of educational fees which would require parents to consider financial issues when deciding which of their children to educate. Poor children in rural areas are particularly affected by inequality resulting from educational fees.
 encouragement of parents and communities to institute gender-equal educational agenda. Perceived opportunity cost of educating girls may be addressed through a conditional cash transfer program which financially reward families who educate their daughters (thus removing the financial barrier that results from girls substituting school attendance for work in the family labor force).
creation of "girl-friendly" schools to minimize bias and create a safe school environment for girls and young women. Currently, a barrier to female school attendance is the risk of sexual violence en route to school. A "safe school environment" is one in which the school is located to minimize such violence, in addition to providing girls with educational opportunities (as opposed to using female students to perform janitorial work or other menial labor).

Mark P. Jones, in reference to Norris's Legislative Recruitment, states that: "Unlike other factors that have been identified as influencing the level of women's legislative representation, such as a country's political culture and level of economic development, institutional rules are relatively easy to change".

In an article about the exclusion of Women from politics in southern Africa, Amanda Gouws said "The biggest hurdles to overcome for women are still on the local level where both men and women are often recruited from the communities and have limited political skills". The level of education in these local governments or, for that matter, the people in those positions of power, are substandard.

One example of the hurdles women face in receiving good education comes from Beijing. "Most women who attended the NGO Forums accompanying the UN conferences, which are for government delegations (though increasingly many governments include activists and NGO members among their official delegates), were middle-class educated women from INGOS, donors, academics, and activists".  Lydia Kompe, a well-known South African activist, was one of these rural women. She noted that she felt overwhelmed and completely disempowered. In the beginning, she did not think she could finish her term of office because of her lack of education. Manisha Desai explains that: "There is an inequality simply around the fact that the UN system and its locations say a lot about the current focus of those systems, such positions being in the US and Western Europe allow easier access to those women in the area. It is also important to note that institutions affect the cultural propensity to elect women candidates in different ways in different parts of the world."

The study of the history of women's representation has been a major contribution in helping scholars view such concepts. Andrew Reynolds states: "historical experience often leads to gender advancement, and political liberalization enables women to mobilize within the public sphere". He argues that we will see a larger number of women in higher office positions in established democracy than in democracies that are developing, and "the more illiberal a state is, the fewer women will be in positions of power".  As countries open education systems to women, and more women participate in historically male dominated fields, it is possible to see a shift in political views regarding women in government.

Quotas

Quotas are explicit requirements on the number of women in political positions. "Gender quotas for the election of legislators have been used since the late 1970s by a few political parties (via the party charter) in a small number of advanced industrial democracies; such examples would be like Germany and Norway". Andrew Reynolds says there is "an increasing practice in legislatures for the state, or the parties themselves, to utilize formal or informal quota mechanisms to promote women as candidates and MPs". The statistics surrounding quota systems have been examined thoroughly by academia. In Zevnik and Others v Slovenia, the court expressed its strong support for gender quotas as a tool to increase women participation in politics. Gender quotas are popular form of state feminism.

Types of quotas include:

 Sex quota systems: institute a "critical value" below which a government is deemed imbalanced. Examples of such critical values include 20% of legislators or 50% of politicians.
 Legal quota systems regulate the governance of political parties and bodies. Such quotas may be mandated by electoral law (as the Argentine quota law, for example) or may be constitutionally required (as in Nepal).
 Voluntary party quota systems may be used by political parties at will, yet are not mandated by electoral law or by a country's constitution. If a country's leading or majority political party engages in a voluntary party quota system, the effect may "trickle down" to minority political parties in the country (as in the case of the African National Congress in South Africa).

Quotas may be utilized during different stages of the political nomination/selection process to address different junctures at which women may be inherently disadvantaged:

 Potential candidacy: sex quota systems can mandate that from the pool of aspirants, a certain percentage of them must be female.
 Nomination: legal or voluntary quotas are enforced upon this stage, during which a certain portion of nominated candidates on the party's ballot must be female.
 Election: "reserved seats" may be filled only by women.

Quota usage can have marked effects on female representation in governance. Stronger quotas are estimated to increase the number of women elected to parliament by about three times as compared to weaker quotas. In 1995, Rwanda ranked 24th in terms of female representation, and jumped to 1st in 2003 after quotas were introduced. Similar effects can be seen in Argentina, Iraq, Burundi, Mozambique, and South Africa, for example. Of the top-ranked 20 countries in terms of female representation in government, 17 of these countries utilize some sort of quota system to ensure female inclusion. Though such inclusion is mainly instituted at the national level, there have been efforts in India to addresses female inclusion at the subnational level, through quotas for parliamentary positions.

With quotas drastically changing the number of female representatives in political power, a bigger picture unravels. Though countries are entitled to regulate their own laws, the quota system helps explain social and cultural institutions and their understandings and overall view of women in general. "At first glance, these shifts seem to coincide with the adoption of candidate gender quotas around the globe as quotas have appeared in countries in all major world regions with a broad range of institutional, social, economic and cultural characteristics".

Quotas have been quite useful in allowing women to gain support and opportunities when attempting to achieve seats of power, but many see this as a wrongdoing. Drude Dahlerup and Lenita Freidenvall argue this in their article "Quotas as a 'Fast Track' to Equal Representation for Women" by stating: "From a liberal perspective, quotas as a specific group right conflict with the principle of equal opportunity for all. Explicitly favoring certain groups of citizens, i.e. women, means that not all citizens (men) are given an equal chance to attain a political career". Dahlerup and Freidenvall claim that even though quotas create theoretical imbalance in opportunity for men and that they necessarily break the concept of "classical liberal notion of equality", quotas are almost required to bring the relation of women in politics to a higher state, whether that is through equal opportunity or just equal results. "According to this understanding of women's under-representation, mandated quotas for the recruitment and election of female candidates, possibly also including time-limit provisions, are needed".

The introduction of gender quotas in the electoral process has spurred controversy from politicians, resulting in resistance to the acceptance of quotas in the political realm. The mobilization of women in politics has been hindered by means of preserving male political survival, and to avoid political interference with male power and domination. Moreover, the implementation of gender quotas has caused the male candidate population to decrease in order for their female counterparts to participate, and this is commonly referred to as the "negative sum," and this can result in a more qualified male being rejected to allow a female politician to participate. Nevertheless, this notion of "more qualified" remains unclear and is too often used as an oppressive tool to maintain the status quo, namely, excluding women. Indeed, we can only use proxies to predict future performances. For example, research has since long proven that the use of SAT scores in the U.S. for university admission favours privileged classes which can receive extra training before the test, while less favoured classes could have succeeded as much or even more once in college. The problem of proxies is even worse in the case of women, as this is added to the cognitive bias of Homophily, which lead men already in power to favour other males to work with them. Furthermore, in the case of Argentina, which is currently mandated for a 30% female party at each level of government, saw the introduction of the 'quota women'; females that were less experienced, and only elected due to the legal requirement of quotas. The introduction of the 'quota women' has triggered what political scientists refer to as a 'mandate effect,' where quota women feel obligated to represent solely the interests of the female public. Moreover, in order to preserve male political survival, "domination techniques" have been utilized to both exclude and delegitimize female representation in politics, and this can be depicted in the case of Argentina, where it took several elections to gain 35% of female representatives. With the increase of female representation in Argentina, issues that were rarely discussed before became paramount in debates, such as "penal laws, sexual assault laws, and laws on maternity leave and pregnancy... sexual education, [and] emergency contraceptive."

Substantive representation contains two distinct parts: both the process and outcome of having female politicians. Substantive representation based on the process is concerned with the gendered perspective, themes that female representatives discuss in political debates, and the impact they have on the creation of bills. Likewise, this process also includes the networking between women in government and female organizations. Substantive representation by outcome relates to the success of passing legislation that enables gender equality to both public and private issues. Moreover, substantive representation as process does not always result in substantive representation by outcome; the implementation of gender quotas and female representation does not directly instigate an influx in legislation.

Critical mass theory has correlations with both substantive representation as process and substantive representation as outcome. Critical mass theory suggests that once a certain percentage of women representatives has been reached, that female legislators will be able to create and enable transformative policies, and this has the potential to place pressure on quota women to act on behalf of all women. Reaching a critical mass eliminates the pressure of maintaining the status quo, to which minorities are forced to conform to avoid being labeled as outsiders by the majority. One paramount criticism of critical mass theory is its attention to numbers, and the understanding that quota women are to represent women collectively. Furthermore, the representation of women as a collective group remains controversial, as "[if] she is a white straight, middle-class mother, she cannot speak for African-American women, or poor women, or lesbian women on the basis of her own experience anymore than men can speak for women merely on the basis of theirs."

One cross-national study found that the implementation of electoral gender quotas, which substantially increased women's representation in parliament, led to increased government expenditures toward public health and relative decreases in military spending, consistent with a presumption that women favor the former while men favor the latter in the countries included in the study. However, while a numerical boost in women legislators may nudge policy in the direction of women's interests, women legislators can be pigeon-holed into specializing in legislation on women's issues, as a study finds for legislators in Argentina, Colombia, and Costa Rica. In Argentina, another study finds that the introduction of gender quotas increased the total frequency of bills introduced regarding women's issues, while lowering the frequency men introduced bills in this legislative area - this evidence leads the authors to conclude that the introduction of female legislators may decrease the incentive of men legislators to introduce policies in line with women's interests.

Legislation
There have been numerous occasions where equal legislation has benefited the overall progression of women equality on a global scale. Though women have entered legislation, the overall representation within higher ranks of government is not being established. "Looking at ministerial positions broken down by portfolio allocation, one sees a worldwide tendency to place women in the softer sociocultural ministerial positions rather than in the harder and politically more prestigious positions of economic planning, national security, and foreign affairs, which are often seen as stepping-stones to national leadership".

Legislative agendas, some pushed by female political figures, may focus on several key issues to address ongoing gender disparities:

 Reducing domestic and gender-based violence. The Convention on the Rights of the Child, published by the United Nations in 1989, addressed home violence and its effects on children. The Convention stipulates that children are holders of human rights, and authorizes the State to 1) prevent all forms of violence, and 2) respond to past violence effectively. Gender-based violence, such as the use of rape as a tool of warfare, was addressed in Resolution 1325 of the UN Security Council in 2000. It calls for "all parties of armed conflict to take special measures to protect women and girls from gender-based violence."
 Reducing in-home discrimination through equalizing property and inheritance rights. National legislation can supersede traditionally male-dominated inheritance models. Such legislation has been proven effective in countries like Colombia, where 60% of land is held in joint titles between men and women (compared to 18% before the passage of joint titling legislation in 1996).

Financing
Sex-responsive budgets address the needs and interests of different individuals and social groups, maintaining awareness of sexual equality issues within the formation of policies and budgets. Such budgets are not necessarily a 50–50 male-female split, but accurately reflect the needs of each sex (such as increased allocation for women's reproductive health). Benefits of gender-responsive budgets include:

 Improved budget efficiency by ensuring that funds are allocated where they are needed most
 Strengthened government position by advocating for needs of all, including the poor and the underrepresented rights
 Increased information flow surrounding needs of those who are usually discriminated against

A sex-responsive budget may also work to address issues of unpaid care work and caring labor gaps.

In the last decades several countries have tied state funding of political parties to compliance with gender quotas, known as gender-targeted public funding. The idea is to use state funding to incentivize political parties to increase gender diversity on their ballot by either giving a fine or give extra resources to parties depending on whether they satisfy a fixed gender balance goal. A 2021 study published in American Political Science Review found that this type of state-driven gendered electoral financing is likely to lead to success when combined with either proportional representation of a 15% minimum of women MPs.

Research/data improvements
Current research which uses sex-aggregated statistics may underplay or minimize the quantitative presentation of issues such as maternal mortality, violence against women, and girls' school attendance. Sex-disaggregated statistics are lacking in the assessment of maternal mortality rates, for example. Prior to UNICEF and UNIFEM efforts to gather more accurate and comprehensive data, 62 countries had no recent national data available regarding maternal mortality rates. Only 38 countries have sex-disaggregated statistics available to report frequency of violence against women. 41 countries collect sex-disaggregated data on school attendance, while 52 countries assess sex-disaggregated wage statistics.

Though the representation has become a much larger picture, it is important to notice the inclination of political activity emphasizing women over the years in different countries. "Although women's representation in Latin America, Africa, and the West progressed slowly until 1995, in the most recent decade, these regions show substantial growth, doubling their previous percentage".

Researching politics on a global scale does not just reinvent ideas of politics, especially towards women, but brings about numerous concepts. Sheri Kunovich and Pamela Paxton's research method, for example, took a different path by studying "cross-national" implications to politics, taking numerous countries into consideration. This approach helps identify research beforehand that could be helpful in figuring out commodities within countries and bringing about those important factors when considering the overall representation of women. "At the same time, we include information about the inclusion of women in the political parties of each country". Research within gender and politics has taken a major step towards a better understanding of what needs to be better studied. Mona Lena Krook states: "These kinds of studies help establish that generalizing countries together is far too limiting to the overall case that we see across countries and that we can take the information we gain from these studies that look at countries separately and pose new theories as to why countries have the concepts they do; this helps open new reasons and thus confirms that studies need to be performed over a much larger group of factors." Authors and researchers such as Mala Htun and Laurel Weldon also state that single comparisons of established and developed countries is simply not enough but is also surprisingly hurtful to the progress of this research, they argue that focusing on a specific country "tends to duplicate rather than interrogate" the overall accusations and concepts we understand when comparing political fields. They continue by explaining that comparative politics has not established sex equality as a major topic of discussion among countries. This research challenges the current standings as to what needs to be the major focus in order to understand gender in politics.

A 2018 study in the American Economic Journal: Economic Policy found that for German local elections "female council candidates advance more from their initial list rank when the mayor is female. This effect spreads to neighboring municipalities and leads to a rising share of female council members."

Grassroots empowerment movements

Women's informal collectives are crucial to improving the standard of living for women worldwide. Collectives can address such issues as nutrition, education, shelter, food distribution, and generally improved standard of living. Empowering such collectives can increase their reach to the women most in need of support and empowerment. Though women's movements have a very successful outcome with the emphasis on gaining equality towards women, other movements are taking different approaches to the issue. Women in certain countries, instead of approaching the demands as representation of women as "a particular interest group", have approached the issue on the basis of the "universality of sex differences and the relation to the nation". Htun and Weldon also bring up the point of democracy and its effects on the level of equality it brings. In their article, they explain that a democratic country is more likely to listen to "autonomous organizing" within the government. Women's movements would benefit from this the most or has had great influence and impact because of democracy, though it can become a very complex system. When it comes to local government issues, political standings for women are not necessarily looked upon as a major issue. "Even civil society organizations left women's issues off the agenda. At this level, traditional leaders also have a vested interest that generally opposes women's interests". Theorists believe that having a setback in government policies would be seen as catastrophic to the overall progress of women in government. Amanda Gouws says that "The instability of democratic or nominally democratic regimes makes women's political gains very vulnerable because these gains can be easily rolled back when regimes change. The failure to make the private sphere part of political contestation diminishes the power of formal democratic rights and limits solutions to gender inequality".

Effects of women's representation in government 
Women being increasingly represented in legislatures and having more political power in general creates various different effects. Women often bring different experiences, attitudes and resources that greatly affect legislation, party agendas, and constituency service. In practice, authoritarian regimes have utilized women representation in government as a strategy to promote democracy throughout the world and draw in foreign help and loans.

Effect of Women’s Leadership in the COVID-19 Crisis 
Affirmative action both corrects existing unfair treatment and gives women equal opportunity in the future. Moreover, the impact that gender representation can have on politics cannot be emphasized enough. In their noteworthy paper on examining the effects of female leadership in the times of crisis, Bruce et al. show that women as mayors in Brazilian municipalities had a negative, sizable and significant impact on the number of COVID-19 deaths and hospitalizations per one hundred thousand inhabitants. It is interesting to note that the effect of women in power in Brazil was stronger in pro-Bolsonaro strongholds, who became infamous for his beliefs of not wearing a mask and being skeptical of vaccines.

In addition to the points raised above, Supriya Garikipati and Uma Kambhampati conduct an analysis to determine if there is any significant difference between COVID-19 pandemic being handled by women as compared to men. Their findings show that COVID-death related outcomes are better in countries which are led by women across all the 194 nations. They even find that testing rates per hundred thousand people are significantly higher in countries led by women, and still report fewer cases than countries led by men. They also reacted quicker by imposing a lockdown faster. While it can be said that women handled the COVID-19 better, that may not mean that they are better leaders than men. However, the pandemic is an extremely effective indicator of handling a crisis situation that any leader must know how to handle; which is an arena women have outperformed men in, especially during the COVID Crisis.

Effect of Women’s representation on Crime rates 
The evidence that women in power have a positive influence is also highlighted by Iyer at al. through their paper on how political representation of women led to higher rates of crime reporting. They also find that women are willing to report crime in villages with female representation in the council. Moreover, the police force is more responsive to crimes against women in areas which have gender-based affirmative action policies.

Variation in federal domestic spending 
One study found that about 9% more federal spending is brought to districts who are represented by a woman as opposed to a man. The study found that the type of women who tend to get elected are often "better" politicians because of the way they have to outperform men to be elected into office.

Legislation regarding women's rights 
One study found that in Argentina, bills involving women's rights regarding violence against women, sexual harassment, reproduction, and gender quotas were more introduced more when more women were in chambers.

Effect of Women's representation on Public Goods Provision
A study also finds that the percentage of women in global legislatures promotes the substantive representation of women as it pertains to the provision of public goods and infrastructure development that women perceive to be important.

Case studies

Africa

Rwanda 
Since the election of 2008, Rwanda is the first country to have a majority of women in legislature. Rwanda is an example of a developing country that radically increased its female leadership because of national conflict. After the Rwandan genocide that killed 800,000 Tutsis in 100 days, the percentage of women in the legislature went from 18% before the conflict to 56% in 2008. Two pieces of legislature enabled and supported women into leadership positions: the Security Council Resolution of 1325 urged women to take part in the post-conflict reconstruction and the 2003 Rwandan Constitution included a mandated quota of 30% reserved seats for all women in the legislature. Of the 24 women who gained seats directly after the quota implementation in 2003, many joined political parties and chose to run again. Though it took almost 10 years, after implementing the gender quotas, Rwanda reached levels of female representation which are amongst the highest in the world. Once again we can see the quota working as an "incubator" for driving women's participation in leadership.

It is argued that the increase in female leadership in Rwanda also led to an increase in gender equality. World Focus (2009) writes, "Rwandan voters have elected women in numbers well beyond the mandates dictated by the post-genocide constitution. And though women in Rwanda still face discrimination, female legislators have influenced major reforms in banking and property laws." A parliamentary women's caucus in Rwanda, the Rwanda Women Parliamentary Forum (FFRP) has also "led a successful effort to pass ground-breaking legislation on gender-based violence in part by involving and garnering support from their male colleagues".

While some researchers see reform, others see dominant party tactics. Shireen Hassim (2009) writes, "It could be argued that in both countries [Uganda and Rwanda] women's representation provided a kind of alibi for the progressive, 'democratic' nature of new governments that at their core nevertheless remained authoritarian, and increasingly so". Rwanda shows that increased participation by women in democracy is conducive to progress in gender equal legislature and reform, but research must be careful not to immediately relate increased gender equality in politics to increased gender equality in policies.

Asia

Afghanistan 

After the Taliban were toppled in 2001 by the United States invasion of Afghanistan, Afghan women's political participation significantly improved. Before the fall of the Islamic Republic of Afghanistan to the Taliban, Afghan women worked in various layers of decision-making positions in the Government of Afghanistan. The proportion of seats held by women in the Parliament of Afghanistan has increased from 4 percent in 1995 to 28 percent in 2018. There were four female cabinet ministers, and there are many Afghan women who were ambassadors, such as Roya Rahmani, Suraya Dalil, and Shukria Barekzai. There were hundreds of women working running private companies, non-profit organizations, and civil society organizations in Afghanistan. There were several women running as vice-presidential candidates in the presidential elections of Afghanistan in 2014. Since the 2021 Taliban offensive, which overthrew the Islamic Republic of Afghanistan and re-established Taliban rule of Afghanistan, women's rights to political participation have contracted sharply.

Azerbaijan 

In 1918, universal suffrage was introduced by the Azerbaijan Democratic Republic, thus making Azerbaijan the first Muslim-majority country and Turk-majority country ever to enfranchise women. Now, 28 women are members of the Azerbaijan Parliament (Milli Məclis). As of 2015, there were 21 women in the 125-seat parliament. The percentage of female members of parliament increased from 11 to 17 percent between 2005 and 2015. Traditional social norms and lagging economic development in the country's rural regions continued to restrict the role of women in the economy, and there were reports that women had difficulty exercising their legal rights due to gender discrimination. As of May 2009, women held the positions of Deputy Chairman of the Constitutional Court, Deputy Chairman of the Nakhchivan AR Cabinet of Ministers, four Deputy Ministers, an Ambassador, and Ombudsmen of Azerbaijan and Nakhchivan AR. Women constituted 4 of the 16 members of the Central Election Commission and chaired 3 of the 125 district election commissions. Some notable female politicians in Azerbaijan include:

Elena Stasova – World's first communist female president (chairman) during 1 week in 1919
Ayna Sultanova – the first Azerbaijani female cabinet minister (People's Commissar of Justice) in 1938.
Zuleykha Seyidmammadova – was a Minister of Social Security in 1952 and first female Azerbaijani military pilot.
Sima Eyvazova – was first non-Russian diplomat of USSR 1982, Minister of Foreign Affairs of Azerbaijan, members of United Nations.
Sakina Aliyeva – the first Azerbaijani female head of parliament 1963.
Tahira Tahirova – Minister of Foreign Affairs of Azerbaijan 1959.
Elmira Gafarova – was a Speaker of the National Assembly of Azerbaijan, and Minister of Foreign Affairs of Azerbaijan 1983
Lydia Rasulova – was a Minister of Social Security (1988–1992), Minister of Education (1993–1997).
Leyla Yunus – Chairman of Information and Analysis Center of Ministry of Defence.
Lala Shevket – is an Azerbaijan politician, first female Secretary of State between 1993 and 1994.
Sudaba Hasanova – was a Minister of Justice 1995
Mehriban Aliyeva – Vice President 2017, the head of Heydar Aliyev Foundation.
Maleyka Abbaszadeh – the chair of the State Students Admission Commission 2000.
Hijran Huseynova – is chairwoman of the State Committee for Family, Women and Children Affairs 2006.
Elmira Süleymanova – first Ombudsman 2002
Ganira Pashayeva – is a Member of the National Assembly of Azerbaijan 2005.
Havva Mammadova – Diplomat, Member of National Assembly of Azerbaijan.
Leyla Aliyeva – Director of International Dialogue for Environmental Action.
Govhar Bakhshaliyeva – is the director of the Institute of Oriental Studies of the Russian Academy of Sciences.

China 

In the 1954 Constitution, the Chinese Communist Party stated that men and women enjoy equal rights in the aspects of political, economic, cultural, social, and family dimensions, especially highlighting a legitimate voting right and the right to be elected. In the Law of the People's Republic of China on the Protection of Rights and Interests of Woman, the Chinese Communist Party also outlined an official requirement of "appropriate number of women deputies", combined with the State's obligations to "gradually increase the proportion of the women deputies" and "actively train[s] and select[s] female cadres" in fundamental national institutions and political organizations. In the following decades, the Chinese Communist Party has revised its constitutional laws and State announcements to give recognition to women's role in the domain of governance. For example, the proclamation issued on the 5th meeting session of the 10th National People's Congress (NPC) stated that "the proportion of women delegates to be elected to the 11th People's Congress should be no less than 20%".

In spite of these declarations, the political system in China remains overwhelmingly male-dominated which, in turn, drives the low engagement rate of female delegates. Despite the new 13th NPC lineup including 742 women out of 2,980 representatives, about 24.9% of the total with a 1.5% increase from the prior term, there is little presence of women in the central power structure of major government organs and their political influence is vastly diminished as they climb up the political ladder. Only 33 women (9%) are recorded to have a seat at the table of the Central Committee for the election of members into the Politburo, a key cornerstone for the approval of all national affairs. In fact, except for the two consecutive offices in 1973 and 1977, the Central Committee has never witnessed over 10% of women engagement in the organization. Additionally, there was a decline in the number of women in the 25-member CCP Politburo from two down to one. In addition, the recent reappointment of Xi Jinping, General Secretary of the Chinese Communist Party, has sparked controversy on the unbroken record of no-women Politburo Standing Committee and the absence of female top leaders in any legislature in China's political history, apart from the exceptions of Vice Premier Liu Yandong and Vice Foreign Minister Fu Ying. This contrasts with Hong Kong and Taiwan where female presidents – Carrie Lam and Tsai Ing-wen – took office in 2018 and 2016 respectively.

Men's domination of politics in China despite written protections for women's rights can be explained by the following underlying causes:

(1) Deprivation of upward mobility

While the implied prerequisite of national appointment is years of experience serving at middle-to-top management, women in the PRC government often struggle to obtain promotion to high-ranked positions, such as party secretary or principal governor. The reason contributing to the captioned phenomenon is gender division of labor across all levels of political structures. Contrary to Chairman Mao Zedong's saying that 'Women hold up half of the sky', Confucians principles' deeply ingrained advocacy "nan zhu wai, nu zhu nei" (men working on the outside, women's place remains on the inside) has shaped gender division of labor. Being assigned highly gender-biased responsibilities within the spectrum of 'women affairs', such as family planning that are reproduction-oriented or with connection to social construction, women's public role and scope of duty are framed under constraints. Women are, at the same time, missing the opportunities to keep a foothold in strategic national affairs, including but not limited to economic development, military planning and diplomatic involvement. The mentioned dilemma is reflected by an actual example in Ning Xiang County, Hunan Province. Women commonly maintain highest authority as Head in women-related bodies, administering concerns on women's unfair treatments and suggesting for children's health development. By the same token, the gendered portfolio gives rise to empowerment of men in the political hierarchy. Consequently, with the lack of exposure to the exemplary official posts and the exclusive offering of key national assignments for men, women's upward mobility is aggravated, resulting in the substantially dwindling likelihood of taking residence in key leading positions.

(2) Biased retirement precondition prejudicing against women

In China, there is an apparent discrepancy in the mandatory retirement age between men and women, in which men are entitled to enjoy 10 more years of work. This policy was established on the ground that women are primary and central support for domestic subjects and their early retirement (at the age of 50–55) would be beneficial to their overall family functioning. This discriminatory policy mirrors the cause in the previous part, in which the working capacity of women is restricted by the society's stereotype on their gender role and corresponding gender responsibilities. In addition, the average age of Chinese chief in Central Committee is 56.1 years old; Top leaders in Politburo were appointed at an average age of 61.1 years old; Whereas Standing Committee of Politburo has the highest average age of 63.4 for its office. All figures being examined, the aggregated average age of appointed leaders exceeds the legal retirement age of women in the nation, meaning that women are least likely to become the center of power before their career comes to an end.

(3) Anti-feminism

While in foreign countries, women's socio-economic status is uplifted and gender division of labor is largely wiped out by feminist movements to open up the availability and variety of work for women, the conservative and politically sensitive Chinese government's censorship on feminism within the country has spread fear among feminism advocates. An illustrative case of which is the backlash of 'Feminist Five' in China. The activists suffered from interrogation, detention and month-long imprisonment due to the distribution of stickers on Beijing subways for drawing the wider community's awareness to sexual harassment against women. Followed by the forced suspension of the Weibo account 'Feminist Voices' due to the government's tightened censorship, feminists encountered escalated obstacles in promoting gender equality. Feminist movements are yet to achieve their goals.

India 

In an effort to increase women's participation in politics in India, a 1993 constitutional amendment mandated a randomly selected third of leadership positions at every level of local government to be reserved for women. These political reservation quotas randomly choose one third of cities to implement a women-only election. In these cities, parties are forced to either give a ticket to a woman candidate or choose to not run in those locations. Due to the randomized selection of cities who must enforce the reservation for women each election year, some cities have implemented the quota multiple times, once or never. This addresses the political discrimination of women at various levels: parties are forced to give women the opportunity to run, the women candidates are not disadvantaged by a male incumbent or general biases for male over female leadership, and the pool of women candidates is increased because of the guaranteed opportunity for female participation.  The effects of the quota system in India have been studied by various researchers.  In Mumbai, it was found that the probability of a woman winning office conditional on the constituency being reserved for women in the previous election is approximately five times the probability of a woman winning office if the constituency had not been reserved for women".  Furthermore, even when the mandates are withdrawn, women were still able to keep their positions of leadership. Given the opportunity to get a party ticket, create a platform and obtain the experience to run for a political position, women are much more likely to be able to overcome these hurdles in the future, even without the quota system in place. The quota system has also affected policy choices. Research in West Bengal and Rajasthan has indicated that reservation affected policy choices in ways that seem to better reflect women's preferences. In terms of voter's perception of female leaders, reservation did not improve the implicit or explicit distaste for female leaders—in fact, the relative explicit preference for male leaders was actually strengthened in villages that had experienced a quota.  However, while reservation did not make male villagers more sympathetic to the idea of female leaders, it caused them to recognize that women could lead. Moreover, the reservation policy significantly improved women's prospects in elections open to both sexes, but only after two rounds of reservation within the same village.  Political reservation for women has also impacted the aspirations and educational attainment for teenage girls in India.

Indira Gandhi is the first female prime minister of India. She is the daughter of Jawaharlal Nehru, the first prime minister of India. She served as Prime Minister from January 1966 to March 1977 and again from January 1980 until her assassination in October 1984, making her the second longest-serving Indian Prime Minister, after her father. Pratibha Patil is the first female president of India. She served as the 12th President of India from 2007 to 2012. Sixteen women have served as the chief minister of an Indian state. Currently, one is in office — Mamata Banerjee of West Bengal.

Following the 2019 elections, the 17th Lok Sabha has the highest ever representation of women at 14.3%, which includes 78 women MPs out of 543, higher than 62 in 2014. But only 6 women became cabinet ministers, lower than 10 in 2014.

Indian panchayats (local government)

The local panchayat system in India provides an example of women's representation at the local governmental level. The 73rd and 74th Constitutional Amendments in 1992 mandated panchayat elections throughout the country.  The reforms reserved 33% of the seats for women and for castes and tribes proportional to their population.  Over 700,000 women were elected after the reforms were implemented in April 1993.

Israel 

Since the founding of the State of Israel, relatively few women have served in the Israeli government, and fewer still have served in the leading ministerial offices. While Israel is one of a small number of countries where a woman—Golda Meir—has served as prime minister, it is behind most Western countries in the representation of women in both the parliament and government.

As of 2019, women comprise 25% of Israel's 120-member Knesset.

Japan 

Japan ranks 127 in the world for the number of women in national parliamentary worldwide as of March 2014, which is lower than their ranking of 122 in 2013. As of February 28, 2013, there are a total of 39 women in the House of Representatives out of 479 incumbents. 
Since the enactment of the modern Japanese Constitution in 1947, Japanese women have been given the right to vote, and the new version of the constitution also allows for a more democratic form of government that guarantees women equality under the law. 
The first female cabinet member, Masa Nakayama, was appointed as the Minister of Health and Welfare in Japan in 1960.  Until 1996, the electoral system for the House of Representatives was based on a single non-transferable vote in multi-member districts. That system was not conducive to women's advancement in public office because it promoted contestation between competing parties and rival candidates within the same party, but overall, the new electoral system was introduced to reduce the excessive role of money and corruption in elections, which ultimately helped women who were running for public office.  In Japanese politics, the kōenkai is a major factor for a successful outcome of an election. The kōenkai, or "local support groups", serve as pipelines through which funds and other support are conveyed to legislators and through which the legislators can distribute favors to constituents in return. Because gaining support from these groups is usually based on personal connections, women's historically disadvantaged position in networking circles hurts their ability to run for public office.

By 1996, Japan adopted another new electoral system for the House of Representatives that combines single-seat districts with proportional representation. Out of 480 seats, 300 are contested in single seat constituencies. The other 180 members are elected through allocations to an electoral list submitted by each party. Candidates who lack a strong support system are listed on a party's proportional representation section. In the 2009 election, only two of eight female Liberal Democratic Party members were elected from a single-seat district, which indicates that few female candidates have enough political support to win a single-seat election. While changes in the electoral process have made positions of public office more accessible to women, the actual participation of women in the Diet remains relatively low. 
As for the future of women in politics in Japan, Prime Minister Shinzō Abe announced in his speech at the Japan National Press Club on April 19, 2013, that a major goal of his national growth strategy is "having no less than 30 per cent of leadership positions in all areas of society filled by women by 2020."

Lebanon 

Lebanese women are considered to have more rights and freedom compared to other women in the Gulf and Middle East. Lebanese women enjoy almost equal civil rights as men. However, due to the large number of officially recognized religions in Lebanon, Lebanese family matters are governed by at least 15 personal statute codes. Lebanese women have legal protection that varies depending on their religion.

Local and regional NGOs have helped to increase awareness of violence against women in Lebanon. Government policies regarding this are poor however, and attempts to improve this area have been met with resistance. Lebanon's laws do not recognize the concept of spousal rape, and attempts to add this to law have been attacked by Lebanese clerics.

Myanmar 

Aung Sang Suu Kyi is a Burmese politician, diplomat, author, and Nobel Peace Prize laureate (1991). She is the de facto head of the government of Myanmar since 2016. She remained under house arrest for almost 15 years from 1989 to 2010, becoming one of the world's most prominent political prisoners.

Although she was prohibited from becoming the president due to a clause in the constitution – her late husband and children are foreign citizens – she assumed the newly created role of State Counsellor, a role akin to a Prime Minister or a head of government. Incumbent president Win Myint is seen as an important ally and placeholder for Aung San Suu Kyi.

On 1 February 2021, Aung San Suu Kyi was arrested by the military during the 2021 Myanmar coup d'état after it declared the November 2020 Myanmar general election results fraudulent.

Singapore 
The 2020 Singapore general election saw a record number of women become lawmakers in Singapore's Parliament. 27 out of 93 seats (29%) for elected Members of Parliament went to women, compared to 21 out of 89 (24%) seats in the 2015 general election. One of the two Non-constituency MP seats has also been taken up by a woman.

Sri Lanka 

While women have served in every Sri Lankan parliament to date, proportions have been low. Adeline Molamure became the first female parliamentarian when she was elected in 1931. Molamure went onto serve as the Deputy President of the Ceylonese Senate. The first woman minister in Sri Lankan history was Vimala Wijewardene when she served as Minister of Health, first appointed in 1956.

Additionally, Sri Lanka saw the world's first elected national leader when the Sirimavo Bandaranaike led Sri Lanka Freedom Party won the July 1960 Ceylonese parliamentary election in an era where the Sri Lankan government was headed by the Prime Minister. Sworn in as Prime Minister, Bandaranaike went on to hold two of the most prominent ministries, Defence and Foreign Affairs. Bandaranaike's election drew international media coverage to Ceylon, with newspapers speculating that they would have to create a new word, stateswoman, to describe her. Bandaranaike served three separate terms as Prime Minister and was the longest-serving Prime Minister in Sri Lankan history, serving a total of 18 years in office. Bandaranaike also played a formative role in the modern state of Sri Lanka, it was under her tenure that Sri Lanka became a republic, removing the British monarch as its head of state.

Chandrika Bandaranaike Kumaratunga held the post of Prime Minister, as deputy head of government for two months, before successfully contesting the 1994 Sri Lankan presidential election, becoming the nation's first female head of state. Kumaratunga also appointed Sirima Bandaranaike as Prime Minister, marking the first time a woman succeeded a woman as prime minister, and the first time any nation in the world had a female President and Prime Minister.

Sri Lanka has seen a multitude of female Cabinet ministers. The current health minister, Pavithra Devi Wanniarachchi has received accolades for her handling of the COVID-19 situation in Sri Lanka.

Sri Lanka has also seen glass ceilings shattered in local government. The 10th Governor of the Central Province, Niluka Ekanayake was the first LGBT person and transgender woman to hold the office of Governor in Sri Lanka. She is widely considered to be the first openly transgender head of a government in the world. The first woman mayor of the capital, Rosy Senanayake was elected in 2018. While Sri Lanka has a long and varied history of woman leaders, female representation in Parliament is still lower than hoped for. In 2016, the government passed legislation mandating that 25% of Parliamentary seats be reserved for women.

Taiwan 

The constitution, adopted in 1947, protected female candidates in elections during the Mainland Period. Article 134 states: "In the various kinds of elections, quotas of successful candidates shall be assigned to women; methods of implementation shall be prescribed by law". The female representation rate in the Legislative Yuan and local councils has steadily increased above 30%.

Tsai Ing-wen won the 2016 president election and became the first female president.

Thailand 

Thailand's first female Prime Minister Yingluck Shinawatra, who was elected as 28th Prime minister of Thailand in 2011, was the youngest prime minister in over 60 years. She was removed from office on May 7, 2014, by a constitutional court decision.

Europe

Germany 

	The gender quotas implemented across parties in Germany in the 1990s serve as a natural experiment for the effect of sub-national party political gender quotas on women participation. Davidson-Schmich (2006) notes, "the German case provides the variance needed to explain the successful (or failed) implementation of these political party quotas". Germany's sixteen state legislatures, the Länder, feature a variety of party systems and varied numbers of potential female candidates. Germany is rated highly in its gender gap, but is an example of a developed country with a low percentage of female leadership in politics.
	Davidson-Schmich's study shows that there are many factors that influence how effective a political quota for women will be. Because Germany's quotas cover culturally diverse areas, Davidson-Schmich was able to see which cities best responded to the increase in women running for office. In her bivariate study, the quota was more successful when the city had a PR electoral system, when more women held inner-party and local political offices, and when there were more women in state-level executive offices. The quota was less successful in rural areas, areas with a large number of Catholic voters, electoral systems with a preferential system, in extremely competitive party systems, and with greater rates of legislative turnover. In her multivariate study of these regions, however, Davidson-Schmich narrowed these factors down even further to the most significant variables of: Catholicism and agricultural economics (Davidson-Schmich, 2006, p. 228). This is very intriguing, and as she explains, "the success of voluntary gender quotas in the German states hinged not on the political structure of these Lander, but rather the willingness of within the system to act on the opportunities inherent in these structures" (Davidson-Schmich, 2006, p. 228). Social factors and inherent gender discrimination are more important in the success of a female political quota than the structure of the quota itself.

Ireland 

In 1990, Mary Robinson was elected as the first female President of Ireland. The second female head of state, Mary McAleese, was president between 1997 and 2011.

The first woman elected to the Dáil was Constance Markievicz in 1918. (Directly prior to this, in the general election of 1918, she became the first woman elected to the House of Commons of the United Kingdom. In line with Sinn Féin abstentionist policy she did not take her seat there).She was appointed Minister for Labour in 1919, the first woman Cabinet minister in Western Europe.
Six decades with all-male Cabinets would elapse before the appointment of the next woman minister in 1979, Máire Geoghegan-Quinn.
Between 1919 and 2019, 19 women served as Cabinet ministers in Ireland, comprising 10% of those who have held senior ministerial positions.

As yet, the highest office attained by women is Tánaiste, that is, deputy prime minister. Four women have served as Tánaiste—Mary Harney (1997-2006), Mary Coughlan (2008-2011), Joan Burton (2014-2016) and Frances Fitzgerald (2016-2017).

Following the 2011 Irish general election and a re-shuffle in 2014, four women were appointed cabinet ministers (the highest number of women in senior ministerial positions ever in Ireland): Joan Burton, Frances Fitzgerald, Jan O'Sullivan and Heather Humphries.

Between 1918 and 2021, 131 women have been elected to Dáil Éireann.

Women remain a small minority of political office-holders in Ireland. The main factors are the role of traditional Catholicism in Irish political culture and the role of localism in party politics. Ann Marie O'Brien has studied the women in the Irish Department of External Affairs associated with the League of Nations and United Nations, 1923–1976. She finds that women had greater opportunities at the UN.

Following Micheál Martin's appointment as Taoiseach in June 2020, after the formation of a Fianna Fáil, Green Party and Fine Gael coalition, Sinn Féin's president Mary Lou McDonald became Leader of the Opposition. She is the first woman to occupy that position and the first to come from a party other than Fianna Fáil or Fine Gael since the Labour Party's Thomas Johnson in 1927.

Italy 
Since the institution of the Italian Republic in 1946, women's right to vote and participate in public institutions has been recognized. According to article 51 of the Italian Constitution, "Citizens of one or the other sex are eligible for public offices and for elective positions under equal conditions, according to the rules established by law. To this end, the Republic adopts specific measures in order to promote equal chances for men and women." Nevertheless, only 21 women were elected, among the 556 members of the Constituent Assembly. In the years that followed, the percentage of women inside both chambers of the Parliament remained quite low. 

The first woman to be appointed as Secretary of State was Christian Democrat Angela Maria Guidi Cingolani in 1951. She served as Secretary of State to the Minister of Industry and Commerce until 1953. In 1976, Christian Democrat Tina Anselmi was appointed by Prime Minister Giulio Andreotti as the Minister for Labour and Social Security. This made her the first woman to hold a ministerial position in the Italian government. 
 In 1979, Italian Communist Nilde Iotti, was elected Chambers of Deputies president, becoming the first woman to hold one of the 5 great offices of the state.

In 2014 Renzi cabinet was the first Italian government in which the number of female ministers was equal to the number of male ministers, excluding the prime minister. After 2018 Italian general election 35% of lawmakers of both chambers of the parliament were women, reaching the highest level in Italian history. In 2018, Maria Elisabetta Alberti Casellati, member of Forza Italia party, was elected Senate president, becoming the first women to serve in the second highest office of the state. In 2019, Marta Cartabia became the first woman to serve as Constitutional Court president.   

After the 2022 Italian general election and the victory of the centre-right coalition, President Sergio Matterella appointed Brothers of Italy leader Giorgia Meloni as Prime Minister of Italy. Giorgia Meloni was sworn in on October 22, 2022, becoming the first-ever female head of government in Italy.

Netherlands 
In 2016, the Dutch government achieved their goal for women in top jobs within the government. A 30% female share was achieved two years earlier than anticipated.

In business, the number of women in top jobs is behind in the political sector. In 2013, the listed companies inserted a 'one in three' rule, which meant that of every three top jobs, one must be exerted by a woman. Not long after, it turned out companies did not put much effort in to achieving this goal, as in practice even less than one in every ten top jobs was occupied by women. The goal for women in top jobs was postponed to 2023. The government and business sector agreed that if every one in five top jobs is not exerted by women, after 2018 the 30% rule will become mandatory.

Meanwhile, women's quota received a fair share of criticism. It has been argued that women should be employed based on their own qualities, not because of their gender.

Nordic countries 
The Nordic countries have been forerunners in including women in the executive branch. The second cabinet Brundtland (1986–1989) was historical in that 8 out of 18 cabinet members were women, and in 2007 the second cabinet Stoltenberg (2005–2013) was more than 50% women. In 2003, Finland had a historical moment when all top leaders of the country were women and also represented different political parties: Social democrat Tarja Halonen was President, Riitta Uosukainen from National Coalition Party was Speaker of the Parliament and after the parliamentary elections of 2003 Anneli Jäätteenmäki from Center party was on her way to become the first female Prime Minister of Finland. Between 2007 and 2011 the Finnish cabinet was 60% female, with a female Prime Minister from 2010 to 2011. Between 2014 and 2015 the Finnish cabinet was 59% female. On June 22, 2010 Mari Kiviniemi of the Centre Party was appointed the second female Prime Minister of Finland. The present Danish government is a coalition between the Social Democrats, the Social-Liberal Party and the Socialist People's Party. All three parties have female leaders. Helle Thorning-Schmidt is Prime Minister.

Finland 
The Finnish national quota law, introduced in 1995, mandates that among all indirectly elected public bodies (at both a national and a local level), neither sex in the governing body can be under 40%. The 1995 laws was a reformed version of a similar 1986 law. Unlike other countries' quota laws, which affect party structure or electoral candidate lists, the Finnish law addresses indirectly elected bodies (nominated by official authorities)—the law does not address popularly elected bodies. The Finnish law heavily emphasizes local municipal boards and other subnational institutions. From 1993 (pre-quota law) to 1997 (post-quota law), the proportion of women on municipal executive boards increased from 25% to 45%. The quota law also affected gender segregation in local governance: before the passage of the law, there had been a gender imbalance in terms of female overrepresentation in "soft-sector" boards (those concerned with health, education, etc.) and female "underrepresentation" in "hard-sector" boards (those concerned with economics and technology). In 1997, the boards were balanced horizontally. However, areas not subject to quota laws continue to be imbalanced. In 2003, it was determined that only 16% of the chairs of municipal executive boards are female—chair positions in this area are not quota-regulated. Presidential elections were held in Finland on 16 January 2000, with a second round on 6 February; the result was a victory for Tarja Halonen of the Social Democratic Party, who became the country's first female President.

Romania 
No political gender quotas exist in Romania, however the Equality Act of 2002 provides that public authorities and institutions, political parties, employers' organizations and trade unions must provide an equitable and balanced representation of men and women at all decisional levels. Following the 2016 elections, women gained only 20.7% of seats in the Lower House (Romanian Chamber of Deputies) and 14.7% in the Upper House (Senate of Romania). These figures are up from the 4.9% of women in the Romanian Parliament in 1990. On the other hand, women are well represented in the central public administration, including the Government, with more than half of decision-making positions held by women, according to a 2011 study commissioned by the Ministry of Labor. Viorica Dăncilă was the prime minister of Romania since 29 January 2018 to 4 November 2019. She was the first woman in Romanian history to hold the office of Prime Minister.

Spain 

In 2007, Spain passed the Equality Law, requiring a "principle of balanced presence" by mandating political parties to include 40–60% of each sex among electoral candidates. This law is unique in that surpasses the 40% parity figure established by the European Commission in 1998; a figure which (according to the EC) indicates "parity democracy." Though there is anecdotal evidence of increasing female representation on a local and national level, there has not yet been national-level data to quantitatively bolster this assertion.

On June 6, 2018, Pedro Sánchez, the leader of the Spanish Socialist Party, presented his cabinet which included eleven women and six men, making it the cabinet with the highest proportion of women in the world at the time. This proportion was increased after a cabinet reshuffle on 12 July 2021.

Turkey 

Tansu Çiller, a career professor of economics since 1983, entered politics in November 1990, joining the conservative True Path Party (DYP). On June 13, 1993, she was elected the party's leader, and on 25 June the same year, Çiller was appointed the prime minister of a coalition government, becoming Turkey's first and only female prime minister to date. She served at this post until 6 March 1996.

The office of Prime Minister was abolished in Turkey in 2018. However, since 1995, the number of women in the parliament has been continually on the rise. Female representation rate did not fall below 10 percent after the 2007 elections.

Turkey's first female governor was Lale Aytaman. Aytaman, who served as the governor of Muğla between 1991 and 1995, was appointed to this position by President Turgut Özal. Meanwhile, Turkey's first female district governor is Özlem Bozkurt Gevrek. She served in the Orta district of Çankırı in 1995. After these years, the number of female governors and district governors increased rapidly.

United Kingdom 

In the United Kingdom, 34% of the lower house, the House of Commons, and 28% of the upper house, the House of Lords, are women as of March 2021, which ranks 38th in the world for the proportion of women in the lower (or only) house of parliament. The government of the United Kingdom at that date included five women Cabinet ministers (23%). The highest proportion of women in Cabinet was 36% between 2006 and 2007. The UK has had three female prime ministers, Margaret Thatcher (1979–1990), Theresa May (2016–2019) and Liz Truss (2022).

The head of state of the United Kingdom from 1952 until 2022 was Queen Elizabeth II. She remains the longest-serving female head of state in world history. The Succession to the Crown Act 2013 repealed the Royal Marriages Act 1772, replacing male-preference primogeniture with absolute primogeniture for those born in the line of succession after 28 October 2011, which meant the eldest child, regardless of sex, would precede his or her brothers and sisters.

Nicola Sturgeon is the First Minister of Scotland (2014–present). Arlene Foster served as First Minister of Northern Ireland (2016–2017 and 2020–2021). In the devolved legislatures of Scotland, Wales and Northern Ireland, the proportion of women members is 47% in Wales and 36% in Scotland and Northern Ireland. In local councils the proportion of women councillors is 36% in England, 29% in Scotland, 28% in Wales and 26% in Northern Ireland. 40% of members of the London Assembly are women.

North America

Canada 

The number of women in the Canadian Parliament has been slowly but steadily increasing since the 1980s and has reached its highest point following the 2021 Canadian federal election where women made up 30.5% of the Canadian House of Commons, higher than the global average of 25.7% and surpassing the 1995 United Nations goal of 30% female representation in government.

United States 

Women secured officeholding rights in the United States in a piecemeal fashion. Some women were even able to achieve positions in offices like mayor, notary public, state librarian, and others before the passage of the Nineteenth Amendment, which gave women the right to vote.

Although the number of women in government in the US has grown, they still hold less than 25% of government positions nationwide. Steinhauer notes that in Congress, both in the Senate and the House of Representatives, women historically and currently are under represented. No political gender quotas exist, mandatory or voluntary.

From 1917, when Representative Jeannette Rankin of Montana became the first woman to serve in Congress, to the 115th congress, a total of 329 women have served as U.S. Representatives, Delegates, or Senators. Between 1917 and 2018, the United States has had 277 women serve in the House of Representatives. From 1922—when Rebecca Latimer Felton became the first woman to serve in the Senate—to the present, 58 women have served in the United States Senate.

In the 115th Congress, 107 (78D, 29R) women hold seats in the United States Congress, comprising 20.0% of the 535 members; 23 women (23%) serve in the U.S. Senate, and 84 women (19.3%) serve in the U.S. House of Representatives.

The United States is one of the shrinking number of industrialized democracies to not have yet had a woman as its leader. Although a country which promotes the rights of women and girls around the world, it is conspicuous for having only male presidents.

Women have served as mayors in the United States since the late nineteenth century and as state governors since 1925. In 2008, the New Hampshire State Senate became the first state legislature upper house to possess an elected female majority.
In 2019, the Nevada Legislature became the first state to have a state legislature composed of a female majority.

In popular media in the United States, female politicians see some focus on their appearance; more so than their male counterparts. A 2011 feminist journal by Carlin and Winfrey focuses on the portrayal of female politicians in the media. According to the journal, the way media perceives women and men is very distinct in the language they chose to use. The language chosen to talk or describe other people can either hurt or help them in a political campaign. As a result of
women being talked about in sexist terms in can greatly affect her reputation and credibility. The journal claims the media uses terms that indicative of women not being valued as individuals. "This is especially true when women are described using metaphors that draw on animals, children, or food. Animal terms focus on the appearance and sexuality of young women (foxy), and as women grow older, or are seen as too aggressive, they may be called barracuda, old bat, shrew, or cow." Females tend to have less issue coverage than males (due to fewer female politicians), but tend to have more coverage on things such as their appearance than male politicians. Male candidates don't get coverage on what kind of suit they are wearing or who designed it. This is due to innate purpose of the media to appeal to demands of their audiences for sales – in this case, the popular female focus on fashion that dominates the media. Studies done on women candidates have shown that women receive more attention in the media for factors such as appearance, clothes, size, and emotional state". In 2015 Rachel Silbermann conducted a study that time spent traveling to and from work is particularly burdensome for those who spend time caring for children, and as women do a majority of the child care and housework, commuting is particularly burdensome to them. Silbermann also found that female students weigh proximity to home twice as heavily as male students do in a hypothetical decision of whether to run for higher office. She suggests that to achieve equal representation of women in government men and women will need to share household responsibilities more equally.

A 2016 study found no evidence that the low share of women in the U.S. House of Representative was due to gender discrimination by voters. According to the author of the study, "these results suggest that the deficit of female representation in the House is more likely the result of barriers to entering politics as opposed to overt gender discrimination by voters and campaign donors."

A 2017 study found that over the prior decade, public opposition to electing a woman as president declined from approximately 26% to 13%. 

A 2018 study in the American Political Science Review did not find evidence that American voters were outright hostile to women in politics or that they held double standards. The study did however find that American voters preferred candidates who were married and had children. Since the burdens of child-rearing disproportionately fall on women in households, the bias in favor of married candidates with children may explain women's underrepresentation in politics.

Nevertheless, the year 2018 saw the largest increase in female representation in state governments following a decade of stagnation: 1,834 women won office at the state and federal level during the mid-term elections, 2,112 women got seats in state legislative offices, and six women have launched campaigns for the highest office in the land.

In 2021, a quarter of all members in Congress were women, the highest percentage in US history. 27% of the House of Representatives are women, while women hold 24 out of 100 seats in the Senate.

According to a survey administered to 1,039 U.S. citizens, the number of women who hold a position in government office could be due to a baseline preference of one sex over another. The results show that 60% of respondents have a baseline gender preference for a male candidate, while 40% prefer a female candidate.

Other notable female politicians in the United States include U.S. Senator and Vice President Kamala Harris; U.S. Representative and Speaker of the House Nancy Pelosi; U.S. Senator and President Pro Tempore Patty Murray; First Lady, U.S. Senator, Secretary of State, and Democratic Presidential nominee Hillary Clinton; Democratic Vice Presidential nominee and U.S. Representative Geraldine Ferraro; Republican Vice Presidential nominee and Alaska Governor Sarah Palin; New Hampshire Governor and U.S. Senator Jeanne Shaheen; Michigan Governor and Secretary of Energy Jennifer Granholm; Kansas Governor and Secretary of Health and Human Services Kathleen Sebelius; South Carolina Governor and U.S. Ambassador to the United Nations Nikki Haley; Wyoming Governor and director of the U.S. Mint Nellie Ross; Texas Governor Miriam A. Ferguson; Alabama Governor, Alabama Lieutenant Governor, and Alabama Treasurer Kay Ivey; U.S. Representatives and U.S. Senators Margaret Chase Smith, Barbara Mikulski, Olympia Snowe, Barbara Boxer, Debbie Stabenow, and Tammy Baldwin; U.S. Senators Nancy Kassebaum, Dianne Feinstein, Carol Moseley Braun, Kay Bailey Hutchison, Susan Collins, Lisa Murkowski, and Elizabeth Warren; U.S. Representatives Edith Rogers, Patsy Mink, Shirley Chisolm, Bella Abzug, Barbara Jordan, Marcy Kaptur, Ileana Ros-Lehtinen, Alexandria Ocasio-Cortez and Marjorie Taylor Greene; and Supreme Court Justices Sandra Day O'Connor, Ruth Bader Ginsburg, Sonia Sotomayor, Elena Kagan, Amy Coney Barrett, and Ketanji Brown Jackson.

Oceania

Australia 

In 1902, Australia became the first country to give some women the vote and allow them to stand for Parliament. This did not apply to Aboriginal Australians, including women, until the amendment of the Electoral Act in 1962. It wasn't until 1983 that Indigenous people had voting rights entirely equal to white Australians when another amendment made enrollment to vote compulsory, rather than voluntary. 19 years after the Commonwealth Franchise Act was passed, Edith Cowan was elected to Legislative Assembly and became the first woman ever elected in any Australian Parliament. Dorothy Tangney was the first woman elected to the Australian senate in 1946, a seat she held for twenty-five years. In the same year, Dame Enid Lyons became the first woman elected to the House of Representatives. In 1986, Joan Child becomes the first female elected to Speaker of the House of Representatives and held the position for over three years. Of the two major political parties in Australia, the Australian Labor Party (ALP) introduced a 35% quota in 1994 and increased this to 40% in 2002 whereas the Liberal National Party (LNP) currently has no gender-based quotas.

As of May 2018, women comprise approximately 38% of senators and occupy 44 of the 150 seats in the House of Representatives. In the current 45th Parliament, the ALP exceeds their 40% quota and is made up of 44% women and the LNP 21%. On 1 January 2017, Australia was ranked 52 out of 175 countries in terms of women in ministerial positions and 50th out of 190 countries in terms of women in the lower house of Parliament. The report issued by UN Women found 24.1% of, or 7 out of the 29 Australian ministers were women.

2007 was a notable year for women in Australian Parliament. Anna Bligh became Queensland's first female premier, a position she occupies for five years, and Julia Gillard MP becomes Deputy Prime Minister. Three years later, Gillard is elected as Australia's first female prime minister. Dame Quentin Bryce became the first and only woman appointed to Governor-General, a position that is representative of the Monarch, in 2008 and served until 2014. Christine Milne is the only woman that has been head of a major political party when she was elected leader of the Australian Greens in 2012.

Indigenous people, women in particular, are grossly underrepresented in Australian Parliament. Since Federation in 1901, there have been 40 Indigenous Australians involved in any Parliament (sixteen women) and eight in the Federal Parliament (four women). Following are some notable figures:

Carol Martin of Western Australia was the first Indigenous woman elected to any Australian Parliament in 2001 and was subsequently re-elected in 2005 and 2008.
Marion Scrygmour of the Northern Territory became the first Aboriginal woman minister in any Australian government in 2002 and became the highest-ranked Indigenous woman in government with her service as Chief Minister of the Northern Territory from 2007 to 2009.
Linda Burney, New South Wales, becomes the first Aboriginal person elected to a State Parliament in 2003 and the first Aboriginal woman elected to the House of Representatives in 2016.
Joanna Lindgren occupied a Senate seat for little over a year from 2015.
Malarndirri McCarthy was elected to the Northern Territory's government in 2005 and gained a Senate seat in 2016.
 The first Aboriginal woman to be elected to Federal Parliament was Nova Peris in 2013 after being selected as a Northern Territory Senate candidate.

New Zealand 

In 1893, New Zealand became the first self-governing country in the world to allow women to vote. This included both European and Māori women. Elizabeth Yates became the first female mayor in the British Empire in 1893. However, it was not until 1919 that women were allowed to run for Parliament, and Elizabeth McCombs became the first women elected to the Parliament in 1933.

In the early twentieth-century party leaders—all of them men—were reluctant to allow women rights beyond basic suffrage, but wartime sped up change. By 1972, the Second Wave of Feminism and the changing attitudes of some party leaders resulted in women gaining more opportunities to become MPs and by 2001 an unprecedented number of women held leadership positions in the New Zealand Parliament.

In recent times New Zealand has had many women in top leadership and government roles including three Prime Ministers; Jenny Shipley (1997–1999), Helen Clark (1999–2008) and Jacinda Ardern (2017–2023). New Zealand has a gender pay gap of 9.5%.

South America

Brazil 

Bertha Lutz was the founding mother of the Brazilian woman suffrage movement. In 1919 she founded the League for Intellectual Emancipation of Women. Lutz also created the Brazilian Federation for Women's Progress (1922), a political group which advocated for Brazilian women's rights, most importantly, their right to vote.  She later played a central role as a member of the small group of feminists at the 1945 founding of the United Nations.

A 1995 Brazilian gender quota was extended first to city councilor positions in 1996, then extended to candidates of all political legislative positions by 1998. By 1998, 30% of political candidates had to be women, with varied results in terms of the gender balance of the officials ultimately elected. Though the percentage of national legislature seats occupied by women dropped in the initial years following the passage of the quota law, the percentage has since risen (from 6.2% pre-quota, to 5.7% in 1998, to 8.9% in 2006). However, Brazil has struggled with the quota law in several respects:

 Though the quota law mandates a certain percentage of candidate spots be reserved for women, it is not compulsory that those spots be filled by women.
 The quota law also allowed political parties to increase the number of candidates, further increasing electoral competition and having a negligible impact on the actual number of women elected.

In Brazil, the Secretariat of Policies for Women, was until recently the main Brazilian state-feminism agency at the federal level. Under Workers' Party governments (2003-2016), Brazil carried out women-focused policies in three dimensions of its foreign policy: diplomacy, development cooperation, and security.

Women in government office
Women have been notably in fewer numbers in the executive branch of government. The gender gap has been closing, however, albeit slowly, and they are still underrepresented.

Current heads of state or government 

The following women leaders are currently head of state or the head of their nation's government:

Historic firsts as head of state or government 

The socialist revolutions taking place during World War I saw the first few women become members of governments. Yevgenia Bosch held the position of Minister of Interior and Acting Leader of the People's Secretariat of Ukraine, one of a number of competing ruling bodies in the Ukrainian People's Republic, the predecessor of Soviet Ukraine (it proclaimed its independence from the Russian Soviet Republic on 25 January 1918). She is sometimes considered the first modern woman leader of a national government.

The first women, other than female hereditary rulers, to hold head of state positions were in socialist countries. Khertek Anchimaa-Toka led the Tuvan People's Republic, a little recognized state that is today part of Russia, from 1940 to 1944. Sükhbaataryn Yanjmaa was acting leader of the Mongolian People's Republic 1953–1954 and Soong Ching-ling was acting co-chair of the People's Republic of China from 1968 to 1972 and again in 1981.

The first democratically elected female prime minister (head of government) of a sovereign country was Sirimavo Bandaranaike of Ceylon (now Sri Lanka) in 1960–1965. She served again 1970–77 and 1994–2000; a total of 17 years. Other early elected female prime ministers were Indira Gandhi of India (1966–1977; she served again 1980–1984), Golda Meir of Israel (1969–1974) and Margaret Thatcher of the United Kingdom (1979–1990). Angela Merkel of Germany is the longest (continuously) serving female head of government (2005–2021).

The first woman to hold the title of "president", as opposed to a queen or prime minister, was Isabel Perón of Argentina (appointed head of state and government, 1974–76). The world's first elected female president was Vigdís Finnbogadóttir of Iceland, whose term lasted from 1980 to 1996. She is the longest-serving elected female head of state of any country to date. Corazon Aquino, President of the Philippines (1986–1992), was the first woman president in Southeast Asia.

Benazir Bhutto, prime minister of Pakistan (1988–1990), was the first female prime minister of a Muslim-majority country. She served again 1993–96. The second was Khaleda Zia (1991–1996) of Bangladesh. Tansu Çiller of Turkey was the first elected Muslim female prime minister in Europe (1993–1996).

Elisabeth Domitien was appointed prime minister of the Central African Republic (1975–1976). Carmen Pereira of Guinea-Bissau (1984) and Sylvie Kinigi of Burundi (1993) acted as head of state for 2 days and 101 days respectively. Ruth Perry of Liberia was the first appointed female head of state in Africa  (1996–1997). Ten years later, Ellen Johnson Sirleaf of Liberia was Africa's first elected female head of state (2006–2018).

Sri Lanka was the first nation to possess a female president, Chandrika Kumaratunga (1994–2000), and a female prime minister (Sirimavo Bandaranaike) simultaneously. This also marked the first time that a female prime minister (Sirimavo Bandaranaike) directly succeeded another female prime minister (Chandrika Kumaratunga). Mary McAleese's election as president of Ireland (1997–2011) was the first time that a female president directly succeeded another female president, Mary Robinson. Jóhanna Sigurðardóttir, prime minister of Iceland (2009–2013), was the world's first openly lesbian world leader, first female world leader to wed a same-sex partner while in office.

The first woman to be appointed President of the European Commission was Ursula von der Leyen in 2019.

Elizabeth II, head of state of the United Kingdom and Commonwealth realms from 1952 to 2022, is the longest-serving female head of state and longest-reigning queen regnant in world history.

When Barbados became a republic on the last day of November 2021, it became the first nation to have a woman as its first president, Sandra Mason. The country has yet to have a male president.

Cabinet ministers

Sofia Panina was the world's first Deputy Minister of State Welfare and Vice Minister of Education in Russia in 1917. Alexandra Kollontai became the first female to hold a ministerial position, as the People's Commissar for Social Welfare in Soviet Russia in October 1917. Yevgenia Bosch held the position of Minister of Interior and Acting Leader of the People's Secretariat of Ukraine from December 1917 to March 1918. The Countess Markievicz was Minister of Labour in the Irish Republic from 1919 to 1922.

The world's first female cabinet minister in an internationally recognized government was Nina Bang, Danish Minister of Education from 1924 to 1926. Margaret Bondfield was the first female Minister of Labour from 1929 to 1931; she was a cabinet minister and member of the Privy Council of the United Kingdom. Dolgor Puntsag was the world's first female Minister of Health in Mongolia in 1930. The first woman to hold the position of finance minister was Varvara Yakovleva, the People's Commissar for Finance of the Soviet Union from 1930 to 1937. Frances Perkins, Secretary of Labor from 1933 to 1945, was the first woman to hold a cabinet position in the United States federal government. Azerbaijan appointed the first female justice minister, Ayna Sultanova, in 1938. Ana Pauker of Romania was the first woman to be a foreign minister in 1947, a position she held for four years. Qian Ying of China was the first female interior minister from 1959 to 1960. The position of defence minister was first held by a woman, Sirimavo Bandaranaike of Ceylon, from 1960 to 1965.

While women's representation as ministers grew through the 20th century, women holding the most senior cabinet posts was relatively rare until the 21st century. In recent years, women have increasingly held the top profile portfolios for their governments in non-traditional areas for women in government, such as foreign relations, defense and national security, and finance or revenue.

Kamala Harris is the first woman to serve as Vice President of the United States, making her the highest ranking female politician in US history. Janet Yellen is the first woman to serve as the U.S. Secretary of the Treasury having previously been chair of the Federal Reserve and chair of the White House Council of Economic Advisers.

First women governors and chief ministers 

Yevgenia Bosch, the Bolshevik military leader, held the People's Secretary of Internal Affairs position in the Ukraine People's Republic of the Soviets of Workers and Peasants from 1917 to 1918, which was responsible for executive functions of the Ukrainian People's Republic, part of the Russian Soviet Republic.

Nellie Ross was the first woman to be sworn in as governor of a U.S. state in January 1925, followed later that month by Miriam A. Ferguson.

Louise Schroeder was the first female member of the Weimar National Assembly. After the division of Germany following World War II, she served as governing mayor of West Berlin from 1948 to 1951.

Sucheta Kripalani was India's first woman Chief Minister, serving as the head of the Uttar Pradesh government from 1963 to 1967.

Savka Dabčević-Kučar, of the Socialist Republic of Croatia (1967–1969), was the first female premier of a non-sovereign European constituent state. She held the position of Chairman of the Executive Council (Prime Minister) of Croatia when it was a constituent republic of Socialist Federal Republic of Yugoslavia.

Imelda Marcos was Governor of Metro Manila in the Philippines from 1975 until 1986 when the People Power Revolution unseated the Marcoses and forced the family into exile.

Griselda Álvarez was the first female governor in Mexico, serving as governor of the state of Colima from 1979 to 1985.

Carrie Lam became the first female Chief Executive of Hong Kong in 2017 and before that was Chief Secretary for Administration from 2012.

Claudia Sheinbaum is the first female mayor of Mexico City. She is the head of the most populous governmental jurisdiction administered by a woman in the Americas, and third most in the world (after Chancellor Angela Merkel of Germany, and Prime Minister Sheikh Hasina of Bangladesh).

Women's suffrage

In some languages, and occasionally in English, the right to vote is called active suffrage, as distinct from passive suffrage, which is the right to stand for election. The combination of active and passive suffrage is sometimes called full suffrage.

The rules for selecting government ministers vary by type of government system and by country.

See also
European countries by percentage of women in national parliaments
Council of Women World Leaders
List of the first female members of parliament by country
Women in positions of power
Critical mass (gender politics)
Women Political Leaders
Muslim women political leaders

Notes

References

Further reading
 Aggestam, Karin, and Ann Towns. "The gender turn in diplomacy: a new research agenda." International Feminist Journal of Politics 21.1 (2019): 9-28 online..
 Aggestam, Karin, and Ann Towns, eds. Gendering Diplomacy and International Negotiations (Palgrave MacMillan, 2018).
  
 
 
 
 
 Towns, Ann, and Birgitta Niklasson. "Gender, International Status, and Ambassador Appointments." Foreign Policy Analysis (2017) 13: 521–540
 
 Ladam, Christina, Harden, Jeffery J., and Windett, Jason H. (April 2018). "Prominent Role Models: High-Profile Female Politicians and the Emergence of Women as Candidates for Public Office." American Journal of Political Science. 62(2). 369-381. 10.1111/ajps.12351

External links
Centre for Advancement of Women in politics (Queens University, Belfast)
"Raising Female Leaders" J-PAL Policy Briefcase, April 2012
 Current female leaders
Political Women (Vol. 1 of 2) by Sutherland Menzies (fl. 1840–1883)
Women in the labyrinths of working life and power, Nordic Labour Journal, March 8, 2013

 
 
Government